This is a list of notable districts and neighborhoods within the city of Los Angeles, California, present and past. It includes residential and commercial areas and business-improvement districts, but does not include sales subdivisions or sales tracts. The guiding precept is Wikipedia:Notability (geographic features)#Geographic regions, areas and places.

AE

 Adams-Normandie
 Alsace
 Angelino Heights
 Angeles Mesa
 Angelus Vista
 Arleta
 Arlington Heights
 Arts District
 Atwater Village
 Baldwin Hills
 Baldwin Hills/Crenshaw
 Baldwin Village
 Baldwin Vista
 Beachwood Canyon
 Bel Air, Bel-Air or Bel Air Estates
 Benedict Canyon
 Beverly Crest
 Beverly Glen
 Beverly Grove
 Beverly Hills Post Office
 Beverly Park
 Beverlywood
 Boyle Heights
 Brentwood
 Brentwood Circle
 Brentwood Glen
 Broadway-Manchester
 Brookside
 Bunker Hill
 Byzantine-Latino Quarter 
 Cahuenga Pass
 Canoga Park
 Canterbury Knolls
 Carthay
 Carthay Circle
 Castle Heights
 Central-Alameda
 Central City
 Century City
 Chatsworth
 Chesterfield Square
 Cheviot Hills
 Chinatown
 Civic Center
 Country Club Park
 Crenshaw
 Crenshaw Manor
 Crestview
 Crestwood Hills
 Cypress Park
 Del Rey
 Downtown
 Eagle Rock
 East Gate Bel Air
 East Hollywood
 Echo Park
 Edendale
 El Sereno
 Elysian Heights
 Elysian Park
 Elysian Valley
 Encino
 Exposition Park

FL

 Faircrest Heights
 Fairfax
 Fashion District
 Filipinotown, Historic
 Financial District
 Florence
 Flower District
 Franklin Hills
 Gallery Row
 Garvanza
 Glassell Park
 Gramercy Park
 Granada Hills
 Green Meadows
 Griffith Park
 Hancock Park
 Hansen Heights
 Harbor City
 Harbor Gateway
 Harvard Heights
 Harvard Park
 Hermon
 Highland Park
 Historic Filipinotown
 Historic Core
 Hollywood
 Hollywood Dell 
 Hollywood Hills
 Hollywood Hills West
 Holmby Hills
 Hyde Park
 L.A. Downtown Industrial District
 Jefferson Park
 Jewelry District
 Kinney Heights
 Koreatown
 La Cienega Heights
 Ladera
 Lafayette Square
 Lake Balboa
 Lake View Terrace
 Larchmont
 Laurel Canyon
 Leimert Park
 Lincoln Heights
 Little Armenia
 Little Bangladesh
 Little Ethiopia
 Little Italy
 Little Tokyo
 Los Feliz

MS

 Manchester Square
 Mandeville Canyon
 Marina Peninsula
 Mar Vista
 Melrose Hill
 Mid-City
 Mid-City Heights
 Mid-City West
 Mid-Wilshire
 Miracle Mile
 Mission Hills
 Montecito Heights
 Monterey Hills
 Mount Olympus
 Mount Washington
 Naud Junction
 Nichols Canyon
 NoHo Arts District
 North Hills
 North Hollywood
 Northridge
 North University Park
 Oakwood
 Old Bank District
 Old Chinatown
 Outpost Estates 
 Pacific Palisades
 Pacoima
 Palms
 Panorama City
 Park La Brea
 Picfair Village
 Pico-Robertson
 Pico-Union 
 Playa del Rey
 Playa Vista
 Porter Ranch
 Rancho Park
 Reseda
 Reynier Village
 Rose Hills
 Rustic Canyon
 San Pedro
 Sawtelle
 Shadow Hills
 Sherman Oaks
 Sherman Village
 Silver Lake
 Skid Row
 Solano Canyon
 Sonoratown
 South Central, Historic
 South Carthay
 South Park
 South Robertson
 Spaulding Square
 Studio City
 Sunland
 Sunset Junction 
 Sun Valley
 Sylmar

TZ

 Tarzana
 Terminal Island
 Thai Town
 Toluca Lake
 Toy District
 Tujunga
 University Hills
 University Park
 University Park, North
 Valley Glen
 Valley Village
 Van Nuys
 Venice
 Vermont Knolls
 Vermont-Slauson
 Vermont Square
 Vermont Vista
 Victor Heights
 Victoria Park
 Village Green
 Virgil Village
 Warehouse District
 Warner Center
 Watts
 Wellington Square
 West Adams
 West Adams Heights
 Westchester
 Westdale
 Western Heights
 West Hills
 Westlake
 West Los Angeles
 Westside Village
 Westwood
 Westwood Village
 Whitley Heights
 Wholesale District
 Wilmington
 Wilshire Center
 Wilshire Park
 Wilshire Vista
 Windsor Square
 Winnetka
 Woodland Hills
 Yucca Corridor

See also

 Central Business District, Los Angeles (1880-1899)
 Los Angeles Historic Preservation Overlay Zone
 Los Angeles Neighborhood Signs
 Mapping L.A.

References

External links
 Bob Pool, "L.A. Neighborhoods, You're on the Map", Los Angeles Times, February 9, 2009 (article about Mapping L.A.)
 Southern California Association of Governments analysis of 2006 census data
 Los Angeles neighborhood signs—Flickr

 
Geography of Los Angeles
Los Angeles
Los Angeles
D01